Tsidii Le Loka-Lupindo (born April 3, 1968, in Lesotho) is an actress, vocalist and composer from South Africa and The Kingdom of Lesotho. She is best known for originating the role of Rafiki in the original Broadway production of Disney's stage musical, The Lion King.

Theatre
Prior to coming to the United States, The Star Newspaper named Tsidii one of the most promising artists in South Africa. Tsidii collaborated and performed as a guest star in various productions including "Riverdance" on Broadway, in which she shared the stage with Irish star Brian Kennedy; and in "Canciones Antes una Guerra / Songs Before the War" (Maria Pages' Flamenco Company) which toured Spain and Italy and won best show of the Seville Bi-Centinial Flamenco Festival (XIII Bienal De Flamenco de Sevilla). With the invitation of her now-deceased mentor Anneline Malebo (former lead singer of the female trio JOY), Tsidii started her career as a member of the newly formed South African Trio "Shadiii" with Anneline Malebo and Faith Kekana.

In 1997, Le Loka originated the role of Rafiki in the first Broadway cast of The Lion King, produced by Disney and directed by Julie Taymor. For her performance, Tsidii received the Drama Desk Award, Drama League Award and Outer Critics Circle Award for Outstanding Featured Actress in a Musical, and garnered a Tony Award nomination. Tsidii was the only performer in The Lion King to also compose a piece, "Rafiki Mourns". She has also been awarded the Ivor Novello Award for International Achievement in Musical Theatre from The British Academy of Composers and Songwriters (the first woman of Southern African original to receive this award). Tsidii stayed on the production for almost a year, leaving in mid-1998. She was replaced by South African singer Thuli Dumakude. In 1999 she played Bloody Mary in South Pacific at the Dallas Theater Center.

Other work
Le Loka's film and TV credits include roles in two made-for-television movies, Rose Red and The Diary of Ellen Rimbauer, and Law & Order. Her television special "Caught In The Act" on WGBY won an Iris Award for best local program. The television special Tsidii Le Loka In Concert aired on TBS. She was invited to perform at Dr. Nelson Mandela's first International Press Conference in Johannesburg after his release from prison. Tsidii holds two degrees: BA Economics and BA Music (both with honors from The University Of Massachusetts, Amherst) and a Diploma in Speech and Drama from The Trinity College of Music, London.

Family history
On her maternal side, Tsidii is a South African traditional princess. She is a descendant of King Langalibalele I, a 19th-century amaHlubi king.

Albums
 Here's To The Night, original CD (featuring Tsidii)
 The Lion King On Broadway, original cast (featuring Tsidii, Heather Headley, Jason Raize, Sam Wright and company)
 Yusef Lateef, Heart Vision (featuring Tsidii and Neenna Freelon)
 Bob Beldon, When Doves Cry (featuring Tsidii, Casandra Wilson, Fareed Haque and others)
 Riverdance On Broadway (featuring Tsidii, Brian Kennedy and Riverdance company)
 Tsidii Le Loka, Here's To The Night (featuring Tsidii)
 Shadiii, Livin It Up (featuring Tsidii, Anneline Malebo, Faith Kekana)
 Shadiii, Last Chance (featuring Tsidii, Anneline Malebo, Faith Kekana)

Awards and nominations

References

Living people
Lesotho emigrants to the United States
American stage actresses
Drama Desk Award winners
1968 births
21st-century American women